Devonshire ministry may refer to:

 First Devonshire ministry, the British government led by the Duke of Devonshire from 1756 to 1757
 Second Devonshire ministry, the British government led by the Duke of Devonshire from April to July 1757